Mohamed Sylla (born 10 September 1994), better known by his stage name MHD, is a French rapper from Paris, who is known for blending trap music with music of West Africa; a genre he coined as "Afro Trap". He was previously part of the rap collective 1.9 Réseaux.

Born in Vendée to a family of West African extraction, MHD began his career as a rapper in Paris at the age of 18. He found success in the mid-2010s through material he published on social media (notably music videos on YouTube) and in 2016 released his debut album MHD, which sold more than 200,000 copies in 6 months. He later received international recognition, and toured in Guinea, England, Senegal and Morocco. His second album, titled 19, was released in September 2018.

In January 2019, MHD was arrested by French police and charged with second-degree murder following investigation into a murder case dating back to 2018. While claiming his innocence, he was remanded in custody for 18 months, before being released under supervision. In 2021, he released a third album, Mansa.

Life and career

1994–2012: Early life
Mohamed Sylla was born in La Roche-sur-Yon (Vendée, France) of a Senegalese mother and a Guinean father; later in life, he moved to the 19th arrondissement of Paris. As a child, he and his family would often listen to music from Africa; he cites Papa Wemba, Koffi Olomide, Salif Keita and Awilo Longomba as influences.

2012–2015: Debut
In 2012, aged 18, Sylla a.k.a. "MHD" (a stage name derived from his first name Mohamed) joined 1.9 Réseaux, a rap collective in the 19th arrondissement. After years of spending time and money trying to make a breakthrough, he eventually quit the gangsta rap scene. He then started to make a living, first by delivering pizza, before landing a job as a waiter in a luxury restaurant in the 6th arrondissement; MHD has since talked about this experience, and the casual racism he was subjected to by the patrons. After getting his BEP restauration (French foodservice qualification) he began considering a career in the catering industry.

2015–2016: The rise of "Afro Trap"
In August 2015, while on vacation, MHD posted a video on the Internet, of himself doing a freestyle over a song by Nigerian band P-Square. The video, which he said he did "just for fun", was received with success on social media, and the positive feedback inspired him to make a comeback into music. However, he had been disappointed with the world of French-language rap from his previous experience, judging there was too much influence from American trends. Taking from his parents' West African roots, he decided to provide diversity to the genre by adding cultural elements of this region into his music, such as musical genres, or singing verses in languages like Fula or Bambara. He coined this newfound genre as "Afro Trap".

Back from vacation, MHD began filming a music video for his freestyle song in his housing estate of the 19th arrondissement. Released in September 2015, the video, titled Afro Trap Part. 1 (La Moula) and featuring local youths dancing in the streets, garnered popularity on YouTube, prompting him to release more songs and videos. Afro Trap Part. 3 (Champions League), a song praising football club Paris Saint-Germain, is considered a breakthrough in MHD's music career, with the song and its dance moves becoming popular with supporters –and later, players– of the club. Soon, he was invited to perform opening acts for French rapper Booba, was featured in the soundtrack of the film Pattaya, and was invited to the Élysée –the French presidential palace– by then-President François Hollande on the occasion of a visit by Guinean President Alpha Condé.

2016–2018: Studio career
His first studio album, named after his stage name, MHD, was released on 15 April 2016. It includes six parts of his Afro Trap series and songs featuring Fally Ipupa and Angélique Kidjo. The album sold more than 200,000 copies in less than six months, earning a double platinum certification in France.

He made successful tours in Europe and Africa, and became an ambassador for clothing brand Puma.

In September 2018, while preparing the release of his second studio album 19, MHD stated on social media that he had become disillusioned with the music industry and that he might retire after the release of the album. His second album, titled "19" (a reference to the 19th arrondissement where he used to live) was released on 19 September 2018, including collaborations with artists such as Salif Keita, Dadju, Orelsan and Nigerian pop star Wizkid; as of 2019, it sold more than 75,000 copies.

2018–2020: Film debut, detention
In 2018, MHD made his film debut starring in Mon frère (My Brother), a French drama directed by Julien Abraham. The film follows the story of Teddy (played by MHD) a young man who gets sent to a youth detention center after being accused of the murder of his abusive father.

Between the filming of Mon frère and the film's theatrical release in July 2019, MHD was arrested in January 2019, and charged with second-degree murder, following investigation by French police into the death of a man in Paris (see § Legal issues). Claiming his innocence, MHD was remanded in custody for 18 months. He was released under judicial supervision in July 2020, still awaiting his trial.

2021-present: Comeback
In May 2021, MHD released Afro Trap Pt. 11 (King Kong), his first song since his release from detention. On 16 July 2021, he released his third album Mansa, including songs featuring artists Tiakola, Naira Marley and Adekunle Gold.

In September 2021, MHD collaborated with Argentine producer Bizarrap, and was featured in a music session.

Controversy

Criticism of police misconduct
In October 2018, MHD uploaded a video on social media in which two young men –one of which was described by MHD as his "big brother"– appeared to be victims of police misconduct. The video prompted investigation from the IGPN, the branch of the French police responsible for internal affairs. A spokesperson for the French police declared that the officers were responding to "threats" coming from the youths in the video.

2019 arrest and detention
In January 2019, his name was cited in an investigation into a murder case, dating back to July 2018, when a 23-year-old man was beaten to death in the streets of Paris during what has been reported as a fight between rival street gangs. Through images collected by surveillance cameras, French police found that assailants came to the crime scene using a car whose owner was identified as MHD; they later named MHD as a suspect himself. MHD was put on custody on 15 January 2019; two days later, he was indicted and charged with second-degree murder. Speaking through his lawyer, MHD denied any involvement in the crime, while his lawyer cited his "lack of a judicial record" and affirmed he has "never been involved in fights between street gangs", adding that she would appeal MHD being put on custody.

Following his arrest, some of his scheduled concerts were postponed indefinitely, while several fellow rappers, including Naza and Black M, voiced their support for MHD.

In March 2020, while MHD was remanded in custody in La Santé, his lawyer stated that he had tested positive for COVID-19 and subsequently requested for MHD to be released under supervision. The request was rejected.

In July 2020, after being detained on remand for 18 months, MHD was released under judicial supervision, and has awaited trial since.

Discography

Studio albums

Extended plays

Singles

Other charting songs

Featured in

Music videos

Filmography
 Mon frère (2019) by Julien Abraham – as Teddy

References

1994 births
Living people
Rappers from Paris
French people of Senegalese descent
French people of Guinean descent
Black French musicians